Jewish Texans have been a part of the history of Texas since the first European explorers arrived in the region in the 16th century. In 1990, there were around 108,000 adherents to Judaism in Texas. More recent estimates place the number at around 120,000.

History of Jewish Texans 

Spanish Texas did not welcome easily identifiable Jews, but they came in any case. Jao de la Porta was with Jean Laffite at Galveston, Texas in 1816, and Maurice Henry was in Velasco in the late 1820s. Jews fought in the armies of the Texas Revolution of 1836, some with James Fannin at Goliad, others at the Battle of San Jacinto. Dr. Albert Levy became a surgeon to revolutionary Texan forces in 1835, participated in the capture of Bexar, and joined the Texas Navy the next year. The first families were conversos and Sephardic Jews.  Later settlers such as the Simon family, led by Alex Simon, came in the 1860s and contributed to the construction of synagogues and monuments such as the Simon Theatre.  B. Levinson, a Jewish Texan civic leader, arrived in 1861. Today the vast majority of Jewish Texans are descendants of Ashkenazi Jews, those from central and eastern Europe whose families arrived in Texas after the Civil War or later.

Organized Judaism in Texas began in Galveston with the establishment of Texas' first Jewish cemetery in 1852. By 1856 the first organized Jewish services were being held in the home of Galveston resident Isadore Dyer. These services would eventually lead to the founding of Texas' first and oldest Reform Jewish congregation, Temple B'nai Israel, in 1868.

The first synagogue in Texas, Congregation Beth Israel of Houston, was founded in Houston in 1859 as an Orthodox congregation. However, by 1874 the congregation voted to change their affiliation to the fledgling Reform movement. The ensuing years were accompanied by the spread of Judaism throughout Texas. Temple Beth-El (San Antonio, Texas) was founded in San Antonio in 1874, followed by Temple Emanu-El of Dallas in 1875 and Brenham's B'nai Abraham in 1885. Temple Beth-El is known as one of the state's more contemporary Reform Jewish congregations due to their very open support of the Jewish LGBT community while B'nai Abraham, currently led by Rabbi Leon Toubin, is the state's oldest existing Orthodox synagogue.

Between 1907 and 1914, a resettlement program, known as the Galveston Movement, was in operation to divert Jewish immigrants from eastern Europe away from the crowded-immigrant cities in the Northeast. Ten thousand Jewish immigrants passed through the port city of Galveston during this era, approximately one-third the number who migrated to the area of the Ottoman Empire that would become the state of Israel during the same period. Henry Cohen, the rabbi of B'nai Israel at the time, is credited with helping to found the Movement.

Texas, however, suffered from antisemitism nearly as soon as it became a state in the 19th century. Judge Roy Bean's first act as Justice of the Peace was to "shoot [...] up the saloon shack of a Jewish competitor". Judge Roy Bean then turned the tent saloon into a part-time courtroom, pronounced his own innocence, and began calling himself the "Law West of the Pecos". During the early 1920s the Ku Klux Klan became influential in Texas.  Billie Mayfield edited a weekly Klan newspaper in Houston that regularly used antisemitic stereotypes to attack Jews as parasites only interested in extracting wealth from the community.  In one article, Mayfield even wrote that “there are lots of good Jews in Houston and all over Texas; you find them with tombstones over their heads.”  In many ways, the KKK threat helped unify the Houston Jewish community, which fought against the racist, antisemitic organization with newspaper articles, business boycotts, and legal action.  By 1924, the Klan had lost much of its local support and influence, and Mayfield's newspaper went out of business. 

Even during the height of the KKK's influence, Houston Jews held powerful roles in the local economy.  By the 1920s, big department stores in Houston, such as Foley's and Battlestein's, were owned by Jews. Brothers Simon and Tobias Sakowitz, who left Russia as young children, opened a clothing store in Houston in 1915 that eventually became Sakowitz's, one of the finest department stores in the city until it declared bankruptcy during the economic downtown of the 1980s and sold most of the business to an Australian company.  The Sakowitz stores closed for good in 1990.

Many Jewish immigrants thrived in Houston, such as Joe Weingarten. Weingarten, who was born in Poland, became a very successful grocery store owner. He pioneered the innovations of cash-and-carry and self-service grocery stores in Houston, building a local chain that reached 70 locations by the time of his death in 1967. He was very active in Jewish social causes as well.

Among the leading philanthropists in Texas were several Jews such as Ben Taub. Taub who was born and raised in Houston, became a leading real estate developer. He donated the land for the University of Houston when it was founded in 1936. He also helped Baylor College of Medicine to move to Houston from Dallas in 1943. Taub founded a new public charity hospital which is known as Ben Taub hospital today. The Jewish community in 1958, decided to build a $450,000 Jewish Institute for Medical Research, which they donated to the Baylor College of Medicine when it was completed in 1964.  Leopold Meyer was a major donor and fundraiser for the Texas Children's Hospital.  He was also the longtime director of two of Houston's most iconic annual events: the Livestock Show and Rodeo, and the Pin Oak Horse Show.

The Handbook of Texas states that "The formal preservation of the history of Texas Jewry goes back to Rabbi Henry Cohen of Galveston and Rabbi David Lefkowitz of Dallas, who set out to interview as many early settlers and their families as possible. They produced a historical account for the Texas Centennial in 1936.". More recently, prominent Jewish Texans include the late retailer Stanley Marcus, longtime CEO of Neiman-Marcus based in Dallas, and Michael Dell, founder and CEO of Dell Computer.  Dell is also active in charity and civic affairs, including helping to fund the Dell Children's Hospital in Austin and the Dell Diamond supporting the Round Rock Express AAA professional baseball team owned by Nolan Ryan and run by the Ryan family.   Joe Straus (born September 1, 1959), elected Speaker of the Texas House of Representatives on January 13, 2009, was the first Jewish Speaker in Texas history.

Notable Jewish Texans 
 Steve Adler
 Ray Benson
 Henri Castro
 Henry Cohen
 Jacob De Cordova
 Jao de la Porta
 Michael Dell
 Kinky Friedman
 Martin Frost
 Peter Hotez
 Isaac Herbert Kempner
 Jimmy Kessler
 Olga Bernstein Kohlberg
 Haymon Krupp
 Abraham Cohen Labatt
 Shimon Lazaroff
 David Lefkowitz
 Albert Levy
 Lewis MacAdams
 Herbert Marcus
 Lawrence Marcus
 Minnie Lichtenstein Marcus
 Stanley Marcus
 Abraham Lincoln Neiman
 Carrie Marcus Neiman
 Levi Olan
 Lois Roisman
 Samuel Irving Rosenman
 Jack Ruby
 Hyman Judah Schachtel
 A. R. Schwartz
 Florence Shapiro
 Samuel M. Stahl
 David E. Stern
 Adolphus Sterne
 Matt Stone
 Joe Straus
 Robert S. Strauss
 Peter Tarlow
 Ben Taub
 Jacob Joseph Taubenhaus
 Stephen Tobolowsky
 Leon Toubin
 Marianne Williamson
 Harris Wittels
 Marvin Zindler

Jewish communities in Texas 
 Temple Beth-El (San Antonio, Texas)
 Alamo Temple Emanuel
 Congregation Beth Jacob (Galveston)
 B'nai Abraham Synagogue, Brenham
 Congregation B'nai Israel (Galveston)
 Temple Emanu-El of Dallas
 Temple Freda (Bryan-College Station)
 Chabad at Texas A&M University
 Congregation Shearith Israel (Texas)
 Congregation Beth Israel of Houston
 Temple Beth-El, Corsicana
 Chabad Lubavitch Center (Houston)
 Young Israel of Houston (Houston)
 Congregation Beth Rambam (Houston)
 Meyerland Minyan (Houston)
 Congregation Beth Yeshurun (Houston)
 United Orthodox Synagogues "UOS" (Houston)
 Torah Vachesed (Houston)
 Congregation Brith Shalom (Houston)
 Congregation Emanu El of Houston
 Temple Mount Sinai (El Paso)
 Congregatiion B'nai Zion (El Paso)
 The Inner Circle (Denton, Texas)
 The Thunderdome Yeshiva (San Antonio, Texas)

See also 

 American Jewish Congress v. Bost
 History of the Jews in Brenham, Texas
 History of the Jews in Dallas
 History of the Jews in Galveston, Texas
 History of the Jews in Houston
 History of the Jews in Brazos County, Texas
 Texas Jewish Historical Society
 Texas Jewish Post

References

External links 
 Bryan Edward Stone, The Chosen Folks: Jews on the Frontiers of Texas
 Article on Jewish Texans by Rabbi Samuel M. Stahl
 Article on history of Jewish Texans
 PIONEER JEWISH TEXANS
 ISJL Encyclopedia of Southern Jewish Communiti: Texas

 
Texas
History of Texas